The UCI Road World Championships - Women's time trial is the annual world championship for road bicycle racing in the discipline of time trial, organised by the world governing body, the Union Cycliste Internationale. The event was first run in 1994.

Medallists

Most successful cyclists

Medallists by nation
Nations are ranked in order of number of gold, silver and bronze medals won.

Footnotes

References

External links
sports123

 
Women's time trial
Women's road bicycle races
Lists of UCI Road World Championships medalists
Recurring sporting events established in 1994